The Department of Defence Production was a Government of Canada department responsible for the centralized planning and purchasing of military equipment. It was disbanded in 1969 and its duties devolved to the individual branches of the military.

References
 

Canadian defence procurement
Military logistics of Canada
Military history of Canada